"Vous", sometimes "Vous...", is the debut single of French singer Merwan Rim from an upcoming album.

It was released in France in May 2011 peaking at #20 on the French Singles Chart.

Charts

References

2011 debut singles
French-language songs
2011 songs